R. A. Miller may refer to:

Reuben Aaron Miller (1912–2006), American folk artist
Roy Andrew Miller (born 1924), American linguist